Golabad may refer to:
 Golabad, Chaharmahal and Bakhtiari
 Golabad, Sarab, East Azerbaijan Province
 Golabad, Shabestar, East Azerbaijan Province
 Golabad, Hamadan
 Golabad, Nain, Isfahan Province
 Golabad, Natanz, Isfahan Province
 Golabad, Fahraj, Kerman Province
 Golabad, Sirjan, Kerman Province
 Golabad, Lorestan
 Golabad, Iranshahr, Sistan and Baluchestan Province
 Golabad, West Azerbaijan